Andre Curtis is an American football safeties coach for the Chicago Bears. He was a former linebacker at Virginia Military Institute.

Playing career 
Curtis was a four-year letter winner playing linebacker for the Keydets between 1996 and 1999.

Coaching career

College coaching career 
Curtis began his coaching career at his alma mater coaching his former position, linebackers. He was there for four years and would then go on to coach the 2004 and 2005 seasons at Georgia Southern as their defensive ends coach. During his time coaching at the college level Curtis had internships with the New York Jets and Tampa Bay Buccaneers as a part of the NFL's Bill Walsh Minority Coaching Fellowship.

New York Giants 
Curtis was a defensive quality control coach for the New York Giants from 2006-2008 coaching under David Merritt who he played under at VMI. With the Giants, Curtis won the Super Bowl.

St. Louis Rams 
From 2009 to 2011 Curtis served as the defensive backs/safeties coach for the St. Louis Rams when he went to the team with Steve Spagnuolo.

New Orleans Saints 
Once again following Spagnuolo, Curtis went to New Orleans and became the Saints assistant defensive backs coach.

Seattle Seahawks 
On March 25, 2015 Curtis was hired by the Seahawks organization to be the team’s safeties coach. In 2017 he was made the team’s defensive backs coach. In 2018 he was promoted to defensive pass game coordinator. He was released by the team after the 2021 season.

Chicago Bears
On February 10, 2022, it was announced that Curtis was joining the Chicago Bears as their safeties coach.

References

External links
 Chicago Bears profile

1976 births
Living people
African-American coaches of American football
African-American players of American football
American football linebackers
New York Giants coaches
New Orleans Saints coaches
Players of American football from Virginia
St. Louis Rams coaches
Seattle Seahawks coaches
21st-century African-American sportspeople
20th-century African-American sportspeople
Chicago Bears coaches